Albert Octave Cadot (6 July 1901 – 9 April 1972) was a French sailor. He competed at the 1948 Summer Olympics and the 1956 Summer Olympics.

References

External links
 
 

1901 births
1972 deaths
French male sailors (sport)
Olympic sailors of France
Sailors at the 1948 Summer Olympics – 6 Metre
Sailors at the 1956 Summer Olympics – 5.5 Metre